Seventh Wave is an album and a song from the Canadian rock group GrimSkunk released in 2002.

Track listing 
Leash on Me 
Seventh Wave 
Comatose 
Headgames 
Free 
Peace of Mind 
Shallow 
Superheroes Never Die 
Failed Again 
Victim of Maturity 
Girlfriend 
Judgement Day 
Machine Gun 
Check-Moi Ben Aller 
J'Suis Comatose

References

2002 albums
GrimSkunk albums
Albums produced by Garth Richardson
Indica Records albums